The term "need to know", when used by government and other organizations (particularly those related to the military or espionage), describes the restriction of data which is considered very sensitive. Under need-to-know restrictions, even if one has all the necessary official approvals (such as a security clearance) to access certain information, one would not be given access to such information, or read into a clandestine operation, unless one has a specific need to know; that is, access to the information must be necessary for one to conduct one's official duties. This term also includes anyone that the people with the knowledge deemed necessary to share it with.

As with most security mechanisms, the aim is to make it difficult for unauthorized access to occur, without inconveniencing legitimate access. Need-to-know also aims to discourage "browsing" of sensitive material by limiting access to the smallest possible number of people.

Examples
The Battle of Normandy in 1944 is an example of a need-to-know restriction. Though thousands of military personnel were involved in planning the invasion, only a small number of them knew the entire scope of the operation; the rest were only informed of data needed to complete a small part of the plan.  The same is true of the Trinity project, the first test of a nuclear weapon in 1945.

Problems and criticism
Like other security measures, need to know can be misused by persons who wish to refuse others access to information they hold in an attempt to increase their personal power, prevent unwelcome review of their work, prevent embarrassment resulting from actions or thoughts.  

Need to know can also be invoked to hide extra-legal activities. This may be considered a necessary use, or a detrimental abuse of such a policy when considered from different perspectives.

Need to know can be detrimental to workers' efficiency. Even when done in good faith, one might not be fully aware of who actually needs to know the information, resulting in inefficiencies as some people may be inevitably withheld information that they require to perform their duty. The speed of computations with IBM mechanical calculators at Los Alamos dramatically increased after the calculators' operators were told what the numbers meant:

In computer technology
The discretionary access control mechanisms of some operating systems can be used to enforce need to know. In this case, the owner of a file determines whether another person should have access. Need to know is often concurrently applied with mandatory access control schemes, in which the lack of an official approval (such as a clearance) may absolutely prohibit a person from accessing the information. This is because need to know can be a subjective assessment. Mandatory access control schemes can also audit accesses, in order to determine if need to know has been violated.

The term is also used in the concept of graphical user interface design where computers are controlling complex equipment such as airplanes. In this usage, when many different pieces of data are dynamically competing for finite user interface space, safety-related messages are given priority.

See also
Compartmentalization (information security)
Freedom of information laws by country
Mushroom management
Principle of least privilege
Security through obscurity

References

Computer security procedures
Classified information